Picris amalecitana, the Amalek ox-tongue, is a species of flowering plant in the family Asteraceae. It is found across Egypt, Turkey and the Middle East.

Taxonomy

Etymology

Picris amalecitana is named after the Amalek, a tribe dwelling south of Judah, in Biblical times.

References

Flora of Egypt
Flora of Turkey
Cichorieae
Taxa named by Pierre Edmond Boissier
Taxa named by Alexander Eig